Gombio is a frazione of the
comune of Castelnovo ne' Monti, in the province of Reggio nell'Emilia, in the region of Emilia Romagna.

The population is estimated at around 66 inhabitants. The village is located 584 meters (1,916 ft) above sea level.

Geography 
The village is located on the northern slopes of Monte Gombio in the area between the Tassobbio stream and the Rio di Leguigno. The inhabited area is composed of numerous small villages not far from each other, surrounded by clays and calanques. Some of the most significant villages are: Casa Scarenzi, Casa Ferrari, Ottole and Soraggio.

Demographics 
The village today is inhabited by a few families and few young people. In the past, up until the Second World War, there were about 600 inhabitants, but when the war was over, the move towards the big cities emptied the village. It partially repopulates during the summer when those who live in the city fall.

Economy

Tourism 
In the summer season the town is populated by vacationers, mostly children and grandchildren of former migrants. The main gathering place for parties is the village club which organizes various events throughout the year and especially in the summer.

Culture 
 Church of the Assumption of the Blessed Virgin Mary (XIV century)
 16th century tower houses
 Dovecote of the XIV century
 Castle bank

References

Note

Bibliography 
 W.Baricchi, G.Cervi, G.Fabbrici, I borghi dell'Appennino Reggiano, 1982
 F.Fabbi, Il Castello di Rossena e la torre di Rossenella, 1953
 G.Giovanelli, Gombio, sintesi di storia civile ed ecclesiastica, 1991

Frazioni of the Province of Reggio Emilia